WWE: Uncaged IV is a compilation album of unreleased professional wrestling entrance theme songs which was released by WWE on November 20, 2017 on online music stores. The album features multiple tracks that were not available to the general public before the release of the album.

Track listing
All songs are composed, written and produced by Jim Johnston.

See also

Music in professional wrestling

References

WWE albums
2017 compilation albums